Flammulina velutipes is a species of gilled mushroom in the family Physalacriaceae. In the UK, it has been given the recommended English name of velvet shank. The species occurs in Europe and North America. Until recently Flammulina velutipes was considered to be conspecific with the Asian Flammulina filiformis, cultivated for food as "enokitake" or "golden needle mushroom", but DNA sequencing has shown that the two are distinct.

Taxonomy
The species was originally described from England by botanist William Curtis in 1782 as Agaricus velutipes. It was transferred to the genus Flammulina by Rolf Singer in 1951.

References

External link

Fungi of Europe
Fungi described in 1782
velutipes
Fungi of North America